Agniya Evgenevna Kuznetsova (born 15 July 1985) is a Russian theater and film actress. She appeared in more than twenty films since 2005.

Biography
Agniya Kuznetsova was born in Novosibirsk, Russian SSR, Soviet Union. Her father was an artist and her mother, Maya Byadova, was a teacher of arts and crafts of the Art Institute of Novosibirsk State Pedagogical University. She graduated from high school in Novosibirsk and attended drama school.

In 2006 she graduated from the Boris Shchukin Theatre Institute (course Yuri Shlykov).

Personal life 
She dated her classmate at the theater institute, actor Leonid Bichevin.
In 2015 she married Maxim Petrov.

Selected filmography

References

External links 

1985 births
Living people
Actors from Novosibirsk
Russian film actresses
Russian television actresses
Russian stage actresses
Russian Orthodox Christians from Russia